Hollingbury Castle, also known as Hollingbury Camp and Hollingbury Hillfort, is an Iron Age hillfort on the northern edge of Brighton, in East Sussex, England. It is adjacent to Hollingbury Park Golf Course.

It is a scheduled monument.

Description
There are original entrances on the east and west sides, the western entrance being inturned on both sides. The pottery found during excavations dates from about 450–250 BC.

The enclosure contains three Bronze Age bowl barrows, aligned roughly north-south near the centre.

Excavations
There was excavation of the site by E. C. Curwen in 1931. It was established that there was an earlier, slightly smaller enclosure: the eastern side of this survives as a low bank aligned north-south, with a filled-in ditch to its east, about  within the eastern rampart, the other sides of the earlier enclosure being beneath the later fort.

The 1931 excavation also revealed postholes at the north-east side and east entrance, showing that the rampart was originally a box rampart, filled with rubble and reinforced with timbers, with a berm and a ditch beyond the outer timbers. Modern posts were placed to mark the position of the postholes.

Excavation of 1967–69 showed the remains of five round houses, of diameters , from the early 6th century BC, in the south-west corner.

References

Hill forts in East Sussex
Scheduled monuments in East Sussex